Fernando Lorenzo Estefan (born January 31, 1960 in Montevideo) is a Uruguayan economist and politician.

Lorenzo graduated in Economics at the University of the Republic in 1984. Afterwards he obtained a Diplome d'Etudes Approfondies en Economie et Finances Internationales at the Paris Dauphine University and a doctorate from the Charles III University of Madrid.

He was the principal of CINVE (1997-2004). He also delivers lectures at the ORT University and the University of the Republic.

He served as Minister of Economy and Finance (2010-2013).

References

Bibliography
 

Living people
1960 births
University of the Republic (Uruguay) alumni
University of Paris alumni
Charles III University of Madrid alumni
Uruguayan economists
Broad Front (Uruguay) politicians
Ministers of Economics and Finance of Uruguay